This is a list of cities and towns in Uganda: The population data are for 2014, except where otherwise indicated. The references from which the estimated populations are sourced are listed in each article for the cities and towns where the population estimates are given.

Twenty largest cities by population
The following population numbers are from the August 2014 national census, as documented in the final report of November 2016, by the Uganda Bureau of Statistics (UBOS).

Cities
In May 2019, the Cabinet of Uganda approved the creation  of 15 cities, in a phased manner, over the course of the next one to three years, as illustrated in the table below. The 7 of the 15 cities started operations on 1 July 2020 as approved by the Parliament of Uganda.

Cities and towns

References

External links
 Uganda: Regions, Major Cities & Towns - Population as per 2014 Census

 
Uganda, List of cities in
Uganda
Cities